James the Less is a figure of early Christianity, one of the Twelve chosen by Jesus. He is also called "the Minor", "the Little", "the Lesser", or "the Younger", according to translation. He is not to be confused with James the Great (also called "James the Elder"). He is identified by some as James, son of Alphaeus and as James, brother of Jesus, thought of by Jerome and others as really the cousin of Jesus. James the Less has traditionally been commemorated along with St. Philip in the Western Christian calendars. Their feast day was observed on May 1 until 1955, when it was moved to May 11 to accommodate the Feast of St Joseph the Worker on May 1. A later revision of the calendar moved the feast back to May 3.

New Testament 
In the New Testament, the name "James" identifies multiple men. James the Less is named only in connection with his mother "Mary", who is also the mother of Joseph, who is called Joses by Mark (Joseph and Joses are variants of the same name). There are four mentions:
 "Mary, the mother of James and Joseph" (Matthew 27:56);
 "Mary, the mother of James the younger and of Joses" (Mark 15:40) ("James the younger" here has also been translated "James the less");
 "Mary, the mother of James" (Mark 16:1 and Luke 24:10).

It is unlikely to be Mary the mother of Jesus since she is not identified as Jesus' mother but only called the mother of James the Less and Joseph/Joses. In Matthew 27:56 she is clearly distinguished from the mother of James, son of Zebedee.

Identification as James the brother of Jesus 

According to Jerome, James the Less is identified with James the brother of Jesus and with James, the son of Alphaeus.

Jerome first tells that James the Less must be identified with James, the son of Alphaeus.

After that, James the Less being the same as James, the son of Alphaeus, Jerome describes in his work called De Viris Illustribus that James "the brother of the Lord" is the same as James, son of Alphaeus:
  
 Thus, Jerome concludes that James the Less, James, son of Alphaeus and James the brother of Jesus are one and the same person.

According to the Golden Legend, which is a collection of hagiographies, compiled by Jacobus de Voragine in the thirteenth century:
	

The same work adds "Simon Cananean and Judas Thaddeus were brethren of James the Less and sons of Mary Cleophas, which was married to Alpheus."

Identification as James, the son of Alphaeus 

The title, "the Less", is used to differentiate James from other people named James. Since it means that he is either the younger or shorter of two, he seems to be compared to one other James. In the lists of the twelve apostles in the synoptic Gospels, there are two apostles called James, who are differentiated there by their fathers: James, son of Zebedee, and James, son of Alphaeus. Long-standing tradition identifies James, the son of Alphaeus, as James the Less. James, son of Zebedee, is then called "James the Great" (although that designation does not appear in the New Testament). Some propose that Alphaeus was the same man as Cleophas or at least the husband of Mary Clopas.

In this regard, Jerome identified James the Less with James, son of Alpheus writing in his work called The Perpetual Virginity of Blessed Mary the following:

Papias of Hierapolis, who lived circa 70–163 AD, in the surviving fragments of his work Exposition of the Sayings of the Lord relates that Mary, wife of Alphaeus is mother of James the Less:

Therefore, James, son of Alphaeus would be the same as James the Less.

In Catholic tradition, James's mother is none other than Mary of Clopas who was among the women at the foot of the Cross of Jesus, weeping. For that reason, and given the fact that the Semitic word for brother is also used for other close relatives, James son of Alpheus is often held as a cousin to Jesus.  He is also thought by some to be the brother of Matthew the Apostle, since the father of both was named Alphaeus (compare Mark 2:14 and 3:18).

Modern Biblical scholars are divided on whether this identification is correct. Catholic priest and biblical scholar John Paul Meier finds it unlikely. Amongst evangelicals, the New Bible Dictionary supports the traditional identification, while Don Carson and Darrell L. Bock both regard the identification as possible, but not certain.

References

Citations

Sources 

 Eusebius, Historia Ecclesiae
 Ronald Brownrigg, Who's Who in The New Testament, Oxford University Press, 1993.

External links 

 Catholic Encyclopedia: Saint James the Less, identifying the Apostle James with James, brother of Jesus (James the Just)
 St. James the Less, Apostle at the Christian Iconography web site
 Here Followeth of James the Less from Caxton's translation of the Golden Legend
 James the Less: The Latter Rain Page

Followers of Jesus
Saints from the Holy Land
Family of Jesus
James, brother of Jesus
Judean people

de:Jakobus, Sohn des Alphäus
ko:알패오의 아들 야고보
he:יעקב בן חלפי
ja:ヤコブ (アルファイの子)
ru:Иаков Алфеев
fi:Jaakob nuorempi
sv:Jakob (apostel, Alfeus son)
tl:Santiagong Makaunti